HD 108874 is a yellow dwarf star (spectral type G5 V) in the constellation of Coma Berenices. It is 195 light years from Earth and has two extrasolar planets that are possibly in a 9:2 orbital resonance.

Star
HD 108874 is probably billions of years older than the Sun however the age is not well constrained. The star has a temperature of about 5600 K. Its metallicity is 1.18 times that of the Sun, meaning it has greater iron abundance relative to hydrogen and helium. It has about the same mass as the Sun, but the radius is probably greater.

Planetary system
In 2003, the jovian planet HD 108874 b was discovered by the US-based team led by Paul Butler, Geoffrey Marcy, Steven Vogt, and Debra Fischer. A total of 20 radial velocity observations, obtained at the W. M. Keck Observatory between 1999 and 2002, were used to make the discovery. In 2005, further observations revealed this star has another jovian planet orbiting further out, designated as HD 108874 c. The orbital parameters of both planets were updated in 2009 with additional observations. Those two planets are near, and possibly in a 9:2 orbital resonance. This means if HD 108874 b orbits the star nine times, then HD 108874 c orbits twice, because the orbital period for planet c is four and a half times longer than planet b.

There is an additional radial velocity signal in the data at a period of 40 days however this likely caused by the stellar rotation period.

See also
List of extrasolar planets

References

External links
 Extrasolar Planet Interactions by Rory Barnes & Richard Greenberg, Lunar and Planetary Lab, University of Arizona

Coma Berenices
108874
061028
Planetary systems with two confirmed planets
G-type main-sequence stars
Durchmusterung objects